The black-tailed antbird (Myrmoborus melanurus) is a species of  antbird in the family Thamnophilidae. It is endemic to Peru and Brazil.

Its natural habitat is subtropical or tropical swamps, which is threatened by habitat loss.

The black-tailed antbird was described by the English ornithologists Philip Sclater and Osbert Salvin in 1866 and given the binomial name Hypocmenis melanurus.

References

black-tailed antbird
Birds of the Peruvian Amazon
black-tailed antbird
black-tailed antbird
black-tailed antbird
Taxonomy articles created by Polbot